Kumaravel Premkumar (born 2 June 1993) is an Indian long jumper from Tamil Nadu. He is the national record-holder in both the indoor and outdoor long jump. He won a bronze medal at the 2012 Asian Indoor Athletics Championships and a silver at the 2013 Asian Athletics Championships.

Early life and education
Premkumar was born on 2 June 1993 in Orthanadu village, Thanjavur, Tamil Nadu. He was one year old when his father died, after which he was raised by his mother, Uma Rani. His mother worked in a local church to provide for the family. He attended St. Antony's School, Thanjavur where physical education teacher Suresh recognised Premkumar's potential and encouraged him to pursue athletics. As a teenager in 2010, Premkumar moved to Chennai to train under coach P. Nagarajan. He joined Pachaiyappa's College Higher Secondary School, and was coached by Nagarajan at the Prime Sports Academy. He passed Higher Secondary Examination in 2012.

Sporting career

Premkumar trains with coach P. Nagarajan at St. Joseph's Sports Academy, Chennai. He represented Tamil Nadu at the South Zone Junior Athletics Championship held in Chennai in August 2011.

Premkumar participated in the 2012 Asian Indoor Athletics Championships that took place in Hangzhou, China. He won a bronze medal and set the national indoor record with a  jump. The previous record was held by Maha Singh, who jumped  at the 2006 Asian Indoor Athletics Championships in Pattaya, Thailand. Premkumar was the only Indian to win a medal at the championships.

Premkumar failed to qualify for the 2013 World Championships because his  jump (more than the 'B' qualifying standard for the championships) at a meet in the United States Olympic Training Center in Chula Vista, California, was wind assisted beyond the 2 metres per second permissible limit, cancelling out the national record and the qualifying effort. At the 79th Railways Athletic Championships in New Delhi, he represented Integral Coach Factory team. Premkumar was declared best athlete of the championships for his record-breaking performance, and was awarded with the Marshal Tito Cup.

See also

Sports in Tamil Nadu

References

External links

Living people
1993 births
People from Thanjavur district
Indian male long jumpers
Athletes from Tamil Nadu
Tamil sportspeople